Burdigala (minor planet designation: 384 Burdigala) is a typical Main belt asteroid. It was discovered by F. Courty on 11 February 1894 in Bordeaux. It was the first of his two asteroid discoveries. The other was 387 Aquitania. Burdigala is the Latin name of the city of Bordeaux.

References

External links
 
 

Background asteroids
Burdigala
Burdigala
S-type asteroids (Tholen)
S-type asteroids (SMASS)
18940211